Thiorhodococcus minor is a bacterium from the genus of Thiorhodococcus which has been isolated from lagoon sediments from the Arcachon Bay.

References 

Chromatiales
Bacteria described in 1998